Capperia taurica is a moth of the family Pterophoridae. It is found in Ukraine and southern Russia. It has also been recorded from China.

The wingspan is 16–17 mm.

References

Moths described in 1986
Oxyptilini
Taxa named by Aleksei Konstantinovich Zagulyaev